Elizabeth Meehan (22 August 1894 – 24 April 1967) was a British screenwriter who worked in both Britain and Hollywood.

Early life 
Meehan was born on the Isle of Wight, and lived in Philadelphia, Pennsylvania.

Career 
As a young woman, Betty Meehan was a model, a professional swimmer, and a chorus girl with the Ziegfeld Follies, in the same sextet of dancers as Billie Dove and Alta King. "Oh yes, I know that chorines have the reputation of being beautiful but dumb," she explained in a 1928 interview, "And, perhaps, some of them are. But you'd be surprised at the girls you'll find in the choruses."

Meehan credited James M. Barrie with helping her transition into screenwriting. During the late 1930s Meehan was employed by the studio head Walter C. Mycroft to work for British International Pictures. Meehan frequently collaborated with the Irish director Herbert Brenon.

Later in her career, Meehan worked in television, writing episodes of Lux Video Theatre, Fireside Theatre, and Mama.

Personal life 
Meehan had a daughter, Frances Meehan Williams (1930-2006), who became an actress and later a psychotherapist. Elizabeth Meehan died in 1967, in New York, aged 72 years. Her daughter donated some of her original scripts and screenplays to the Special Collections library at UCLA.

Selected filmography
 The Great Gatsby (1926)
 Sorrell and Son (1927)
 The Telephone Girl (1927)
 Laugh, Clown, Laugh (1928)
 The Rescue (1929)
 The Case of Sergeant Grischa (1930)
 Lummox (1930)
 Beau Ideal (1931)
 Oliver Twist (1933)
 West of Singapore (1933)
 Harmony Lane (1935)
 Spring Handicap (1937)
 Over She Goes (1938)
 Star of the Circus (1938)
 Housemaster (1938)
 A Gentleman's Gentleman (1939)
 Parachute Nurse (1942)
 Storm Over Lisbon (1944)
 Northwest Outpost (1947)

References

Bibliography
 Harper, Sue. Women in British Cinema: Mad, Bad and Dangerous to Know. Continuum International, 2000. 
 Low, Rachael. ''History of the British Film: Filmmaking in 1930s Britain. George Allen & Unwin, 1985.

External links

1894 births
1967 deaths
Ziegfeld girls
20th-century British screenwriters
British emigrants to the United States